The Sant Boi de Llobregat Museum conserves and carries out research into the cultural heritage and historic memory of the town of Sant Boi de Llobregat in Catalonia, Spain. The main museum collections are those of Iberian, Roman and Medieval archaeological remains unearthed during the different excavations carried out in the town and different ethnographic sources. The museum houses the permanent exhibitions Sant Boi. Temps i espai (Sant Boi. Time and space) and Rafael Casanova i el seu temps (Rafael Casanova and the times he lived in), as well as different temporary exhibitions. Founded in 1998, the museum is part of the Barcelona Provincial Council Local Museum Network and is housed in several buildings: Can Barraquer, Can Torrents, the Roman thermal baths and Benviure tower.

Facilities

Can Barraquer
Houses the Sant Boi de Llobregat Museum since 26 March 2011, Can Barraquer is a 14th-century manor house in which Rafael Casanova, the last Conseller en cap, or head minister, of the Consell de Cent (Council of One Hundred) of Barcelona, lived and died.

Can Torrents
Can Torrents is a 16th-century manor house. Formerly the museum's exhibition room, since the opening of Can Barraquer houses the museum's technical services and is the central office of the Municipal Historic Archive.

Roman baths
The Roman baths of Sant Boi are the best-preserved private baths from this time period in Catalonia. They were built towards the end of the 2nd century, during a period of economic splendour in the Llobregat valley, and the bathhouse was fully functional until the 5th century. They were unearthed in 1953 and opened as a museum in 1998.

Benviure tower
The Benviure tower is a Romanesque circular defence tower with walls nearly 2 metres thick; various excavation campaigns have uncovered remains from Iberian and Medieval times. The monument was recently restored and guided visits are given.

References

External links
 
 Local Museum Network site

Barcelona Provincial Council Local Museum Network
Sant Boi de Llobregat
Historic house museums in Catalonia
Archaeological museums in Catalonia